The 2007 Speedway Grand Prix Qualification or GP Challenge was a series of motorcycle speedway meetings used to determine the 3 riders that would qualify for the 2007 Speedway Grand Prix to join the other 9 riders that finished in the leading positions from the 2006 Speedway Grand Prix and 4 seeded riders.

The qualifying returned following a one years absence.

Wiesław Jaguś won the GP Challenge.

Format
 First round (48 riders qualifying from respective national championships)
 Second round – 16 riders to GP Challenge
 Final round – 3 riders from the GP Challenge to the 2007 Grand Prix

Second round
16 riders to GP Challenge

Final round

Gp challenge
3 riders to 2007 Grand Prix
19 August 2006  Vetlanda

References

Speedway Grand Prix Qualification
Speedway Grand Prix Qualifications